Those marked in bold have now been capped at full International level.

Group A

Head coach: Petr Mikheyev

Head coach: John Peacock

Head coach: Francesco Rocca

Head coach: Abdullah Avcı

Group B

Head coach: Ivan Gudelj

Head coach: Avraham Bahar

Head coach: Ruud Kaiser

Head coach: Yves Débonnaire

Footnotes

UEFA European Under-17 Championship squads
Squads